The 1914 United States Senate election in Illinois took place on November 3, 1914.

Incumbent Republican senator Lawrence Yates Sherman, first elected to a partial term by the Illinois General Assembly in a special election the previous year, was reelected to a full term as U.S. senator by a popular vote.

Election information
The primaries and general election coincided with those for House and those for state elections. Primaries were held September 9, 1914.

The 1914 United States Senate elections were the first to be held after the Seventeenth Amendment to the United States Constitution went into effect, and this was therefore the first Illinois U.S. Senate election to be held by a popular vote.

Democratic primary

Candidates

Ran
Barratt O'Hara, lieutenant governor of Illinois
Lawrence B. Stringer, U.S. congressman
Roger Charles Sullivan, Cook County Democratic Party political boss and former the clerk of the Cook County Probate Court
James Traynor
Harry Woods, Illinois secretary of state

Declined to run
Frank D. Comerford, former Illinois state senator and candidate for lieutenant governor in 1912

Results

Republican primary

Candidates
Frank Hall Childs
William E. Mason, former U.S. senator
Lawrence Yates Sherman, incumbent U.S. senator
Myer J. Stein

Results

Progressive primary

Candidates
Raymond Robins, economist, writer, and chairman of the Illinois Progressive Party state committee

Results

Socialist primary

Candidates
Adolph Germer, trade union organizer

Results

General election

Candidates
John M. Frances (Socialist Labor)
Adolph Germer (Socialist), trade union organizer
Raymond Robins (Progressive), economist, writer, and chairman of the Illinois Progressive Party state committee 
Lawrence Yates Sherman (Republican), incumbent U.S. senator
Roger Charles Sullivan (Democratic), Cook County Democratic Party political boss and former the clerk of the Cook County Probate Court
George W. Woolsey (Prohibition Party)

Results

See also
1914 United States Senate elections

References

1914
Illinois
United States Senate